The 1972–73 Australian region cyclone season was an above-average tropical cyclone season, in terms of activity. Additionally, it is also the deadliest tropical cyclone season recorded in the Australian region, with Cyclone Flores killing an estimated 1,650 people alone, making Flores the single-deadliest tropical cyclone recorded in the entire Southern Hemisphere.

Systems

Tropical Cyclone Ivy-Beatrice

Tropical Cyclone Ivy developed over the eastern Indian Ocean on 7 December. The cyclone entered the southwest Indian Ocean basin after crossing 80°E and was renamed Beatrice.

Severe Tropical Cyclone Jean

On 10 January Jean developed northwest of Western Australia. It strengthened into a Category 4 severe tropical cyclone, before being last noted on 17 January.

Severe Tropical Cyclone Kerry

At Wickham on 21 January 1973 more than 30 houses were partly unroofed and some houses received major damage. There was no damage to buildings in Dampier, Roebourne or Karratha as the cyclone crossed the coast well to the east. Kerry passed close to a number of oil-drilling rigs causing damage and lost productivity time that cost over one million dollars. Maximum recorded gust was 140 km/h at Cape Lambert.

Tropical Cyclone Leila-Gertrude

Tropical Cyclone Leila formed offshore Western Australia on 21 January. Moving generally westward, the storm crossed 80°E on 23 January and was renamed Gertrude.

Severe Tropical Cyclone Adeline

Tropical Cyclone Adeline developed in the Gulf of Carpentaria on 27 January. Moving south-southwestward, Adeline made landfall near the Northern Territory-Queensland border, shortly before dissipating on 29 January.

Tropical Cyclone Maud

Tropical Cyclone Maud existed offshore Western Australia from 28 January to 31 January.

Tropical Cyclone Kirsty

Tropical Cyclone Kirsty developed southwest of the Solomon Islands on 24 February. Heading generally southward, Kirsty dissipated well east of New South Wales on 1 March.

Severe Tropical Cyclone Leah

The next system, Cyclone Leah, formed near the coast of Western Australia on 27 February. Moving southwestward, Leah eventually dissipated on 11 March.

Severe Tropical Cyclone Madge

Cyclone Madge originated in the vicinity of the Solomon Islands on 28 February. Tracking west-southwestward, Madge struck the Cape York Peninsula early on 4 March. By late the following day, the cyclone made landfall near Numbulwar, Northern Territory. Moving across Northern Territory and Queensland, Madge emerged into the Indian Ocean on 10 March. The storm headed generally westward for the next several days, until dissipating on 18 March.

Severe Tropical Cyclone Nellie

On 13 March Cyclone Nellie formed offshore Queensland. It moved generally west-southwestward before dissipated on 23 March.

Tropical Cyclone Bella

Cyclone Bella developed over the Arafura Sea on 20 March. It struck North Territory before dissipating on 25 March.

Tropical Cyclone Paula

The next system, Cyclone Paula, formed southwest of Indonesia on 16 March. Paula moved southwestward and dissipated about six days later.

Severe Tropical Cyclone Flores

The strongest tropical cyclone of the season developed in the Banda Sea on 26 April. The storm struck the island of Flores before dissipating on 29 April. Widespread destruction of houses, schools, and bridges was reported in four of the island's districts. 53 on Flores were killed, and 21 perished in the sinking of a Timorese fishing ship, the Oarbiru. Additionally, over 1,500 fisherman were reported lost at sea. The area's remoteness kept information about the cyclone's effects from reaching the news for over a month. The storm killed a total of 1,650 people, making it the deadliest tropical cyclone recorded in the Southern Hemisphere.

Severe Tropical Cyclone Marcelle

Marcelle, the final tropical cyclone of the season, developed well west of Indonesia on 29 April. The storm struck near Busselton, Western Australia late on 7 May. Marcelle dissipated well south of Australia about two days later.

See also

1892 Mauritius cyclone – The third-deadliest cyclone recorded in the Southern Hemisphere
Cyclone Mahina – The most powerful tropical cyclone recorded in the Southern Hemisphere; also the deadliest tropical cyclone in Australian history
Cyclone Idai – The second-deadliest cyclone recorded in the Southern Hemisphere; devastated the nations east of the Mozambique Channel in 2019
Cyclone Leon–Eline – A very long-lived and deadly tropical cyclone that devastated Mozambique in 2000
1970 Bhola cyclone – The deadliest tropical cyclone recorded worldwide
Atlantic hurricane seasons: 1972, 1973
Eastern Pacific hurricane seasons: 1972, 1973
Western Pacific typhoon seasons: 1972, 1973
North Indian Ocean cyclone seasons: 1972, 1973

References

Australian region cyclone seasons
Aust
 disasters in Australia
 disasters in Australia
 disasters in Oceania
 disasters in Oceania